Love Among Thieves is a 1987 American romantic thriller television film directed by Roger Young, starring Audrey Hepburn, Robert Wagner, Patrick Bauchau, Jerry Orbach, Brion James, and Samantha Eggar. It premiered on ABC on February 23, 1987. The ending left the door open for either a sequel or possibly a television series, but neither eventuated. Reportedly, Hepburn donated her salary to UNICEF. Love Among Thieves is notable for several reasons. It was the only made-for-television film in which Hepburn appeared (although she had done some live drama productions in the 1950s). It was also the last film in which she took a starring role (her next, and final, film performance in 1989's Always was a cameo).

This was the first Hepburn film since 1981's They All Laughed. It contains a number of intentional references to Hepburn's earlier films, mostly in dialogue, although the basic plot borrows from her 1960s films Charade, Paris, When It Sizzles and How to Steal a Million. The film includes her final on-screen kiss (with Wagner).

On October 6, 2009, the film became available on DVD through the Warner Archive Collection.

Premise
Baroness and concert pianist, Caroline DuLac, steals three jewel-encrusted Fabergé eggs from a San Francisco museum. The eggs are demanded as ransom for her kidnapped fiancé in Latin America. She boards a plane for the Latin American city of Ladera, as per instructions, and is met by a drifter named Mike Chambers.

Caroline first believes that Mike is one of the kidnappers, until a mysterious man in a trench coat tries to kill her and Mike comes to the rescue. They are both captured by a band of Mexican bandits, who also may or may not be part of the scheme. Meanwhile, the couple are pursued by Spicer, a hired thug assigned to retrieve the loot.

Cast
 Audrey Hepburn as Baroness Caroline DuLac
 Robert Wagner as Mike Chambers
 Patrick Bauchau as Alan Channing
 Jerry Orbach as Spicer
 Brion James as Andre
 Samantha Eggar as Solange

References

External links
 
 

1987 television films
1987 films
1980s American films
1980s crime thriller films
1980s heist films
1980s romantic thriller films
ABC network original films
American crime thriller films
American heist films
American romantic thriller films
American thriller television films
Crime television films
Films directed by Roger Young
Films scored by Arthur B. Rubinstein
Films shot in Los Angeles County, California
Films shot in San Francisco
Romance television films
Romantic crime films